Voyage to the Bottom of the Sea is a 1964–1968 American science fiction television series based on the 1961 film of the same name. Both were created by Irwin Allen, which enabled the film's sets, costumes, props, special effects models, and sometimes footage, to be used in the production of the television series. Voyage to the Bottom of the Sea was the first of Irwin Allen's four science fiction television series (the three others being Lost in Space, The Time Tunnel, and Land of the Giants), and the longest-running. The show's theme was underwater adventure.

Voyage was broadcast on ABC from September 14, 1964, to March 31, 1968, and was the decade's longest-running American science fiction television series with continuing characters. The 110 episodes produced included 32 shot in black-and-white (1964–1965), and 78 filmed in color (1965–1968). The first two seasons took place in the then-future of the 1970s. The final two seasons took place in the 1980s. The show starred Richard Basehart and David Hedison.

Show history

Pilot episode 
The pilot episode "Eleven Days to Zero" was filmed in color but shown in black-and-white. It introduces the audience to the futuristic nuclear submarine S.S.R.N. Seaview and the lead members of her crew, including the designer and builder of the submarine Admiral Harriman Nelson (Richard Basehart), and Commander Lee Crane (David Hedison), who becomes the Seaviews captain after the murder of her original commanding officer. The submarine is based at the Nelson Institute of Marine Research in Santa Barbara, California, and is often moored some 500 feet beneath the facility in a secret underground submarine pen carved out of solid rock. The Seaview is officially for undersea marine research and visits many exotic locations in the Seven Seas, but its secret mission is to defend the planet from all world and extraterrestrial threats in the then-future of the 1970s.

 Season 1 

The first season's 31 episodes included gritty, atmospheric story lines devoted to Cold War themes and excursions into near-future speculative fiction, involving espionage and sci-fi elements. Aliens, sea monsters and dinosaurs were featured, but the primary villains were hostile foreign governments. While fantastic, the scripts had a recognisably contemporary setting.

The first episodes began with Admiral Nelson and the crew of the Seaview fighting against a foreign government to prevent a world-threatening earthquake, and continuing with a foreign government destroying American submarines with new technologies in "The Fear Makers" and "The Enemies". The season also had several ocean peril stories in which the Seaview crew spent the episode dealing with the normal perils of the sea. Two examples are "Submarine Sunk Here" and "The Ghost of Moby Dick". The season introduced a diving bell and a mini-submarine, and the first episodes featuring extraterrestrials (Don Brinkley's "The Sky is Falling") and sea monsters.

During the course of the first season, Nelson was promoted from a three-star to a four-star admiral. It was also established that while essentially a marine research vessel, SSRN Seaview was also part of the U.S. nuclear armed fleet (most notably defined in William Read Woodfield's episode, "Doomsday"). The season ended with the Seaview crew fighting a foreign government to save a defense weapon.

 Season 2 

The second season began with a trip inside a whale, a trip inside a volcano, and a few Cold War intrigue and nuclear war-themed episodes, and saw several brushes with world disaster. The season ended with a ghost story, one of the show's few sequels.

Due to ABC's demands for a somewhat "lighter" tone to the series, the second season saw an increase in monster-of-the-week type plots, yet there were still some episodes that harkened back to the tone of the first season. The second season also saw a change from black-and-white to color. The beginning of the second season saw the permanent replacement of Chief "Curly" Jones with Chief Francis Ethelbert Sharkey, due to the death of Henry Kulky, who portrayed Chief Jones.

The most important change in the series occurred during this season when a notably redesigned Seaview interior was introduced, along with the Flying Sub, a yellow, two-man mini-submarine with passenger capacity. The Flying Sub could leave the ocean and become airborne. The futuristic craft greatly increased the Seaview crew's travel options. It was launched from a bay, access to which was via a sealed hatch stairway at the bow section. The Seaviews private observation deck from the first season was never seen again. The Seaview control room was expanded and a large rectangular panel screen of flickering lights was added. The Seaview also now had a powerful laser beam in its bow light. The small mini-sub from the first season was retained and occasionally still used in the color episodes.

The ship's enlisted men were also given more colorful uniforms (red or light blue jumpsuits) and white Keds Champion sneakers. The traditional sailor uniforms worn in the first season were only seen in stock footage from the first season and on characters who were newly filmed to match up with that footage.

A second-season episode, "The Sky's On Fire", was a remake of the basic storyline of Irwin Allen's original film Voyage to the Bottom of the Sea (1961) using considerable film color footage, though several film sequences were removed and had been featured in other first-season episodes such as "The Village of Guilt" and "Submarine Sunk Here."

A few later season two episodes were filmed without Richard Basehart, who was hospitalized for a bleeding ulcer. He filmed the scenes in the Flying Sub for "The Monster's Web" before hospitalization, requiring a stand in and other characters taking over his lines. He was missing entirely from the next two episodes. These episodes didn't feature his character at all, while in one story "The Menfish" Gary Merrill guested as Admiral Park, a colleague of Nelson's who substituted for him. Basehart returned for "Return of the Phantom," the final episode of the season.

 Season 3 
The third season of Voyage to the Bottom of the Sea ran simultaneously with two other series produced by Irwin Allen, Lost in Space (in its second season) and The Time Tunnel.

The third season began with Dick Tufeld (voice of the Robot on Lost in Space) playing an evil disembodied brain from outer space. The season continued with a werewolf story that is one of the few episodes to inspire a sequel. In one episode, the Seaviews officers and crew encountered Nazis who believed World War II was still ongoing. The third season only had two espionage stories and one ocean peril story that were reminiscent of the first season. One of those three stories was about a hostile foreign government trying to steal a strange new mineral with the aid of a brainwashed Admiral Nelson. This espionage story was the end of the third season.

The final two seasons continued the shift towards paranormal storylines that were popular in the late 1960s. Mummies, werewolves, talking puppets, and an evil leprechaun all walked the corridors of the Seaview.  There were also fossil men, flame men, frost men, lobster men, and shadow men.
The opening credits were largely identical to the revised season two, but the initial season two yellow lettering credits that were first altered to white, (and then back to yellow on the later revised sequence) were now depicted in a golden/yellowish lettering, and closing credits were set over a green-backed painting of Seaview underwater.

 Season 4 

The fourth and final season of Voyage began with Victor Jory playing a five-centuries old alchemist and the Seaview is threatened by the hydrodynamic effects of a major volcanic eruption. Starting with the eighth episode of the season,  there were revamped opening credits depicting action sequences and the stars' pictures in color set on a sonar board design. The closing credits picture remained unchanged from season three. Near the end of the fourth season, there were three unrelated stories of extraterrestrial invasion. One episode had an unknown master of disguise infiltrating and wreaking havoc aboard the Seaview.  Another episode depicted Nelson, Morton and Sharkey gaslighting Crane. There were two time travel stories featuring the enigmatic but dangerous Mister Pem. The second had the Seaview going back in time to the American Revolution. The episode (and series) ended with the Seaview returning to the present. The final scene of the show had Nelson and Crane sitting in the seldom-used easy chairs on the port side of the observation nose discussing how fast time goes by.

In March 1968 it was announced that Voyage would not be back for a fifth season.

 Music 

The series' main theme, "The Seaview Theme", was written by Paul Sawtell. A new darker, more serious theme composed by Jerry Goldsmith was introduced at the beginning of the second-season episode "Jonah and the Whale", but this was quickly replaced by the original version. A version of the Goldsmith suite re-orchestrated by Nelson Riddle was heard as incidental music in the episode "Escape From Venice", and the original Goldsmith suite was used as incidental music throughout the rest of the series. The series' main composer, supervisor and conductor was Lionel Newman, who for the second season composed a serious sounding score for when the episode credits (episode title/guests/writer/director) were shown just after the theme song, which would be used by many episodes (starting with "The Left Handed Man") thru the second and into the early third season. Other guest composers included   Lennie Hayton, Hugo Friedhofer, Star Trek: The Original Series composer Alexander Courage, Morton Stevens, Leith Stevens (no relation) who wrote the music to nine episodes, and Sawtell, who worked on the show for a while in the first season.

GNP Crescendo issued a soundtrack album in 1997 as part of its series tying into the documentary The Fantasy Worlds Of Irwin Allen, featuring Sawtell's theme from the series and his score for the pilot episode "Eleven Days To Zero" (tracks 2–6) and Goldsmith's work for "Jonah and the Whale."

 Voyage to the Bottom of the Sea''' Main Title (:29)
 Murderous Pursuit (2:54)
 Ocean Floor Search/Squid Fight (5:34)
 Solid Ice (1:48)
 Lost/Job Well Done (3:35)
 End Title (The Seaview Theme) (:40)
 Jonah and the Whale (Main Title) (:30)
 A Whale of a Whale/Thar She Blows/A Whale of a Time/The Second Dive (4:23)
 A Meal Fit for a Whale/Crash Dive/Sub Narcotics (4:18)
 Collision Course I/Collision Course II/Diving Party/Going Down (4:44)
 Home Free Part I/Home Free Part II (3:58)
 Jonah and the Whale (End Credit) (:50)

Cast

Richard Basehart as Admiral Harriman Nelson
David Hedison as Captain Lee Crane
Robert Dowdell as Lieutenant Commander Chip Morton
Derrik Lewis as Lieutenant Commander O'Brien (pilot episode, 1st-2nd seasons)
Henry Kulky as Chief "Curly" Jones (1st season)
Terry Becker as Chief Petty Officer Francis Ethelbert Sharkey (2nd–4th seasons)
Del Monroe as Kowalski
Arch Whiting as Sparks
Paul Trinka as Patterson
Brent Davis as Peters (crew member – 1 episode)
Lew Gallo as Kruger (crew member – 1 episode)
Ralph Garrett as Somers (crew member – 1 episode)
Allan Hunt as Stuart "Stu" Riley (2nd Season)
Richard Bull as the Doctor
Wayne Heffley as Seaview Doctor (2nd Season 1965–1966, 3 episodes)
Paul Carr as Casey Clark (1st season, recurring afterwards only in stock footage scenes)

Scott McFadden, Ray Didsbury, Marco Lopez, and Ron Stein provided additional crewmen in non-speaking roles, often requiring stunt work.

 Episode list 

 Season 1 (1964–65) 
{| class="wikitable plainrowheaders" style="width:100%; background:#fff;"
|- style="color:#FFFFFF"
! style="background:#515151; width:20px"| 
! style="background:#515151; width:20px"| 
! style="background:#515151"| Title
! style="background:#515151"| Directed by
! style="background:#515151"| Written by
! style="background:#515151; width:135px"| Original air date

{{Episode list
| EpisodeNumber = 10
| EpisodeNumber2 = 10
| Title = Submarine Sunk Here
| DirectedBy = Leonard Horn
| WrittenBy = William Tunberg
| OriginalAirDate = 
| ShortSummary =  The ship's diving bell may be the Seaviews only hope when the sub becomes entangled in a derelict minefield. Co-starring Carl Reindel, Eddie Ryder, Robert Doyle and Wright King.
| LineColor = 515151
}}

{{Episode list
| EpisodeNumber = 14
| EpisodeNumber2 = 14
| Title = The Ghost of Moby Dick
| DirectedBy = Sobey Martin
| WrittenBy = Robert Hamner
| OriginalAirDate = 
| ShortSummary = A whale specialist's son is killed when his father's data-gathering methods enrage an enormous whale. Now the crippled father needs Seaview's help to (as he claims) continue his research. Guest stars June Lockhart, Edward Binns.
| LineColor = 515151
}}

|}

 Season 2 (1965–66) 
All episodes from Season 2 and onwards in color

 Season 3 (1966–67) 
{| class="wikitable plainrowheaders" style="width:100%; background:#fff;"
|- style="color:#FFFFFF"
! style="background:#700070; width:20px"| 
! style="background:#700070; width:20px"| 
! style="background:#700070;| Title
! style="background:#700070;| Directed by
! style="background:#700070;| Written by
! style="background:#700070; width:135px"| Original air date

{{Episode list
| EpisodeNumber = 62
| EpisodeNumber2 = 4
| Title = Night of Terror
| DirectedBy = Justus Addiss
| WrittenBy = Robert Bloomfield
| OriginalAirDate = 
| ShortSummary = The crew aboard the Seaview's diving bell become stranded on a mysterious tropical island. Guest star Henry Jones.
| LineColor = 700070
}}

|}

 Season 4 (1967–68) 

Other media

A paperback novel, City Under the Sea, authored by Paul W. Fairman, was published in 1965, to tie into the series.  It had a different storyline than the episode of the same name. The book should also not be confused with the later Irwin Allen film of nearly the same name, which was about the attempts of the world's first under-sea city to prevent the earth from being hit by a rogue asteroid. It is not about "A wealthy family attempting to move the Earth's oceans to another planet for resettlement" as has occasionally been stated.
Western Publishing published a comic book based on the series. Western's comic company, Gold Key Comics put out a series that ran 16 issues from 1964 to 1970.  Most covers were painted, and most had a photo of either Richard Basehart or David Hedison on them. The first issue of the Gold Key comic was a story called "The Last Survivor". The story brought back Dr. Gamma, the villain from the pilot episode, "Eleven Days to Zero". Gold Key's story was the only sequel to the pilot episode. Hermes Press reprinted the entire run in 2 hardback volumes; the first was released in 2009.
In 1966, World Distributors, a British publishing company in Manchester, England, published the first of two Voyage to the Bottom of the Sea Annuals, hardback gift books. The British-made books used the series' characters in all new stories but also contained a reprint of a story from the Gold Key Comics series. Both books were mostly prose stories with some illustrations.
Aurora Plastics Corporation released a plastic model kit of Seaview as well as the Flying Sub during the original run of the series. From 1975 - 1977, Aurora reissued both kits; the Seaview (kit #253) was modified with a sea floor base (originally created for the Dick Tracy Space Coupe kit #819) and sub surface details, while The Flying Sub (kit #254) was remodeled in a different base color. The 1975 - 1977 kits—part of Aurora's reissue of 5 of their 11 TV & movie-related science-fiction kits, also included instruction sheets with a detailed history of the TV series or movie plot.
Both kits were recently re-released by Polar Lights. The Flying Sub model sold more than the Seaview model.
Other collectables from the show include a board game with illustrations based on the pilot episode, as well as a boxed card game with a painting of the divers' battle with the giant octopus, both from Milton Bradley, and a school lunch box with thermos from Aladdin with depictions of Admiral Nelson and Captain Crane trying to save the Flying Sub from an evil looking octopus. There was also a Sawyers View-Master slide reel based on the episode "Deadly Creature Below."
In 1964, a 66-card set of black-and-white trading cards was released by Donruss. Selling for 5 cents a pack, the set consisted of stills from the first season.  Today, a set in mint condition can sell for several hundred dollars.
In the UK, TV Tornado published 14 issues that contained Voyage to the Bottom of the Sea stories, either comics or text with illustrations as per the issue and at least two TV Tornado annuals had original stories as well.
Theodore Sturgeon wrote a novel, Voyage to the Bottom of the Sea, based on the original script written by Irwin Allen for the movie, and published in 1961.

Popular culture

The popularity of the TV show inspired Mad Magazine (March 1966) to spoof the show, their version being called Voyage to See What's on the Bottom, featuring a submarine called the Seapew and a flying sub called Son of Seapew.
Australian TV show Fast Forward sent-up the series as Voyage to the Bottom of the Harbour.
Stock footage of Seaview was used in the Wonder Woman episode "The Bermuda Triangle Crisis."
An often referenced running joke is that in many episodes of the series, characters lurch to camera movements on the visibly static set, to give the illusion that Seaview had sustained impact. This was an old movie trick, and was commonly used by other television shows of the period, including Star Trek, but none did it so frequently, nor with such relish as Voyage. Hence, the technique is still commonly known as "Seaview Rock and Roll".
On the SciFi Channel's 1995 documentary tribute to Irwin Allen, The Fantasy Worlds of Irwin Allen, series co-star June Lockhart recalled this technique being used also on Lost In Space, where the cast also knew it as "the rock-and-roll".
The Disney Channel animated series Phineas and Ferb has an episode with a pun on the title called Voyage to the Bottom of Buford.

Home media
20th Century Fox has released all 4 seasons on DVD in Region 1 in two volume sets.

In Region 2, Revelation Films has released the entire series on DVD in the UK in four complete season sets.  On March 26, 2012, they released Voyage To The Bottom Of The Sea: The Complete Collection, a 31-disc set featuring all 110 episodes of the series as well as bonus features.

In Region 4, Madman Entertainment released the first two seasons on DVD in Australia on August 20, 2014.

Reboot
On November 23, 2020, it was announced that Legendary Entertainment is developing a new version. Chris Lunt and Michael A. Walker are writing the project.

See also
seaQuest DSV tv series

Notes

 References SEAVIEW: The making of Voyage to the Bottom of the Sea by Tim Colliver, copyright 1992, published by Alpha Control Press.Voyage to the Bottom of the Sea DVD setsThe Irwin Allen Scrapbook Volume One Voyage to the Bottom of the Sea Edited by William E. Anchors, Jr.; copyright 1992 by Alpha Control Press.Irwin Allen Television Productions 1964–1970, Jon Abbot, McFarland and Company, 1996Voyage au fond des mers : guide pour la série d'Irwin Allen, Max Philippe Morel, Lulu.com, 2012TV.Com''

External links

 

1964 American television series debuts
1960s American science fiction television series
1968 American television series endings
American Broadcasting Company original programming
Black-and-white American television shows
English-language television shows
Live action television shows based on films
Nautical television series
Submarines in fiction
Television series by 20th Century Fox Television
Television series set in the future
Television series by Irwin Allen Television Productions
Television series set in the 1970s
Television series set in the 1980s
Underwater civilizations in fiction
Television series created by Irwin Allen